Advance America (formerly Citizens Concerned for the Constitution) is a conservative political advocacy group in the U.S. state of Indiana.  Advance America claims that it is a "non-partisan tax exempt, educational organization." It claims affiliation with approximately 4,000 Indiana churches, nearly one third of all churches in the state of Indiana.

History and governance
Advance America was founded in 1980 by Eric Miller, an attorney from Indianapolis, with the help of ten other people.  It shares space and employees with Miller's law office. It is governed by a seven member board of directors consisting entirely of pastors.

Activities
Advance America publishes an annual voter's guide informing voters of the stance of various candidates for local office on issues Advance America is concerned about.  These voter guides are distributed primarily through mail, e-mail, and churches.

Advance America attempts to keep people informed about what bills and issues the state legislature is considering through mailings, e-mails, voting record summaries, pastor and citizen briefings, and speaking engagements (frequently in churches).

Advance America claims that their staff reviews each bill to come before the state legislature.  They testify before legislative committees, talk to legislators, draft amendments and bills, and mobilize the public to contact legislators.

Issues
Advance America regularly campaigns for issues that they perceive affect the family and religious freedom.  They supported the controversial Indiana Religious Freedom Restoration Act as well as pushing to uphold the state's same sex marriage ban. They have opposed legislation permitting transgender persons to use the bathroom of their choice. They have opposed extending regulations on daycares to include those daycares run by churches.  They support legislation mandating public schools to display a poster in each classroom prominently displaying the United States national motto "In God We Trust".

In 2019, on the one year anniversary of the Stoneman Douglas High School shooting, Indiana passed a bill providing mental health funding to schools.  Advance America pushed for an amendment requiring parental consent before children could seek mental health treatment under the bill; such language was included in the final bill.

In 2021 they planned events dedicated to organizing citizens to lobby school boards to ban critical race theory and gender identity instruction, and to require parental consent for mental health services and sex education in schools.

See also
Indiana gubernatorial election, 2004 - where Eric Miller ran in the Republican primary

References

External links

Lobbyist reports

American Christian political organizations
Non-profit organizations based in Indiana
Political advocacy groups in the United States
Conservative organizations in the United States